Eimear O'Sullivan (born 1988 in Cork) is a camogie player and an accountant, winner of All Ireland camogie medals in 2008, 2009, 2014, 2015 and 2017.She won All-Star awards in 2014 and 2017. In the 2014 final she produced an inspiring performance scoring a point from wing-back and won the player of the match award. A sister of former All- Ireland medal winner Linda O'Sullivan, she holds All-Ireland Senior and Senior 'B' honours as well as National League and provincial medals. Holds an Ashbourne Shield with Cork IT. and won a county Senior championship medal with Carrigdhoun in 2004. She has also won the Senior B and Junior county championships with her club as well as colleges and schools medals.

References

External links 
 Official Camogie Website
 Denise Cronin's championship diary in On The Ball Official Camogie Magazine
 https://web.archive.org/web/20091228032101/http://www.rte.ie/sport/gaa/championship/gaa_fixtures_camogie_oduffycup.html Fixtures and results] for the 2009 O'Duffy Cup
 All-Ireland Senior Camogie Championship: Roll of Honour
 Video highlights of 2009 championship Part One and part two
 Video Highlights of 2009 All Ireland Senior Final
 Report of All Ireland final in Irish Times, Independent, and Examiner

1988 births
Living people
Cork camogie players